Na Hyeon-jeong (born ) is a South Korean female volleyball player. She is part of the South Korea women's national volleyball team.

She participated in the 2014 FIVB Volleyball World Grand Prix, and the 2015 FIVB Volleyball World Grand Prix.
On club level she played for GS Caltex in 2014.

Personal life
Na Hyeon-jeong attended Seoul Jungang Girls' High School.

References

External links
 Profile at FIVB.org

1990 births
Living people
South Korean women's volleyball players
Place of birth missing (living people)
Asian Games medalists in volleyball
Volleyball players at the 2018 Asian Games
Asian Games bronze medalists for South Korea
Medalists at the 2018 Asian Games